Julián Šimko (30 November 1886 – 16 March 1956) was the land president of Slovakia in the First Czechoslovak Republic from 1938 to 1939.

See also
Prime Minister of Slovakia

References

Czechoslovak politicians
1886 births
1956 deaths